Malakichthys mochizuki, Mochizuki's seabass, is a species of is a species of marine ray-finned fish belonging to the family Acropomatidae. This fish is found in Australiabn waters.

References

Acropomatidae
Fish described in 2002